The Beautiful Room Is Empty is a 1988 semi-autobiographical novel by Edmund White. 
 
It is the second of a trilogy of novels, being preceded by A Boy's Own Story (1982) and followed by The Farewell Symphony (1997). It depicts the adolescence and early adulthood of its protagonist, and documents his experience of homosexuality in the 1950s and 1960s, ending with the Stonewall riots of 1969.

External links
New York Times review

American autobiographical novels
1988 American novels
1980s LGBT novels
Novels by Edmund White
Alfred A. Knopf books
Lambda Literary Award-winning works
Novels with gay themes
American LGBT novels